Palais Pálffy is a palace located on Josefsplatz in the Innere Stadt (inner city) district of Vienna, Austria. It was once owned by the noble Pálffy family. 

Today, the building is used for music performances and various kinds of public functions. The  is located in the Palais.

External links
 Palais Palffy homepage

Pálffy
Buildings and structures in Innere Stadt